Vladislav Borisov (born 22 June 1991) is a Bulgarian male acrobatic gymnast. With partners Borislav Borisov, Dennis Andreev and Hristo Dimitrov, Borisov achieved 4th in the 2014 Acrobatic Gymnastics World Championships.

References

1991 births
Living people
Bulgarian acrobatic gymnasts
Male acrobatic gymnasts